Rheinhausen is a town in the district of Emmendingen in Baden-Württemberg in Germany.

Geography
Rheinhausen is located in the northern Breisgau region on the Rhine river. Along the Rhine, it includes part of the Taubergießen Nature Reserve, one of the largest nature reserves in Baden-Wuerttemberg.

Neighboring communities
To the west, across the Rhine river in France, is the Rhinau Island Nature Reserve, in the Schœnau commune of the Bas-Rhin department in France's Alsace region. Across the town's southern border is the village of Weisweil, to the east are the towns of Kenzingen and Herbolzheim, and to the north is the town of Rust, in the Ortenau district.

Villages
In 1972, the town of Rheinhausen was formed by combining two formerly independent communities, now each a village (Dorf), Niederhausen and, to its south, Oberhausen.

References

Emmendingen (district)